Ramany vs Ramany (also known as Ramani Vs Ramani) is a Tamil-language sitcom, directed by Naga and produced by K. Balachander under the banner Min Bimbangal. It is the first ever Tamil comedy play in the "sitcom" format. The sitcom follows the happenings in the daily life of a wife and a husband both named Ramany. Mr. Ramany is an innocent sales respresentative while Mrs. Ramany is a housewife who complains about how she wants a better husband. The first season starred Vasuki Anand and Prithvi Raj. First season was first telecasted in 1998 in Sun TV and ran for 25 episodes. The second season starred Ram G and Devadarshini. Second season was telecasted in 2001 in Raj TV and ran for 51 episodes. It was one of the most popular Tamil comedy shows. Both the seasons were re telecasted in Vasanth TV.

The sitcom again became popular after the series was uploaded on Kavithalayaa's YouTube channel. A new season titled, Ramany vs Ramany 3.0 is preparing for release with Vasuki Anand and Ram G, reprising their roles from season 1 and 2, respectively. The third season was released on aha as a web series. The first episode will aire on 4 March 2022. Devadarshini will not reprise her role from season 2 for the third season and Vasuki who acted in first season made her acting comeback in season 3.

Plot

Season 1 
The story is about Mr. Ramany (Prithivi Raj), a man with a silver spoon when he was born. He was the fourth child in the family and before him are his three agonising sisters. His three sisters envied him because he is the much-awaited male baby in the family. So he became so special to everyone especially to their parents. As time passes by, Mr. Ramany wanted to go to USA – somewhere away from his three sisters, from his army father who acts like their house is a military academy and from their mother who always lectures in their house since she is a primary school teacher. However, fate does not allow him to go. His family wanted him to marry a girl who has the same name as his name, Ramany (Vasuki). She lives in the USA for a short span of time. The two Ramanys are different individuals with distinct dreams but they are thrown to be together out of their destiny. The family was successful on getting the two married. But they appear to be an utterly incompatible couple, who agree to disagree on almost everything. Everyday comedy takes new shape in this serial.

Season 2 
The show showcases the daily humorous happenings in the middle class household run by the housewife Ramany (Devadarshini) and her husband Ramany (Ram G) with their daughter Ramya. Both Ramany's long for their carefree joyous life when they were newly married and think about how life has changed for them after the arrival of their only daughter. Mr.Ramany is a sales representative who has a level of humour. How Mr.Ramany often falls into trouble due to his innocence and how in the end his wife is the one to the rescue most of the times takes new shape in this serial. Mrs.Ramany is an ordinary Tamil housewife who complains about all the better suitors who were willing to marry her, her effort to make their middle class ends meet, about her husband who is not shrewd enough to earn more and the list goes on. Their daughter Ramya is the only person who speaks sense into them in ridiculous situations. Nair is Mr.Ramany’s family friend who stays in their outhouse for a meagre rent. Uncle Chandhru is a respectable person who knows only something about everything and gets into troubles. Mrs.Ramany’s mother and a gossip monger maid servant, Kamala adds spice to this story.

Cast

Season 1 

Vasuki Anand as Mrs. Ramany
Prithvi Raj as Mr.Ramany
 Poovilangu Mohan as Mr. Ramany's father 
Mythily
Gnanam
Sreenivasan
Judge Rajagopal
Chetan as a thief/Sarathy 
Vivek
Durga
Thadi Balaji as Dr. Babu/Odissi dance shoot director (episodes 2,18)
M. V. Raman
Telephone Venkatraman
Samuel
Benjamin as Lawyer Krishnamoorthy (episode 7)
Jayanthi
Krishnan as Police officer (episode 10)
R.K.D. Srinivasan
Sambantham
Rani
Vinai
Deepa Venkat as Lavanya, Mrs. Ramany's cousin sister (episode 15)
Ramachandran
Malini
Sureshwar
Ragavesh
Priya Gariyali
Riyaz Khan as Suresh, Mrs. Ramany's cousin brother (episodes 19,20)
Hanumanthu

Season 2 

 Ram G as Mr. Ramany
 Devadarshini as Mrs. Ramany
 Nair Raman 
 Sreenivasan as Chandramoulli
 Shobana as Kamala
 Baby Ranjitha as Ramya (Ramanys' daughter)
 Poovilangu Mohan as Renigunta Venkatrama Reddy (Mrs. Ramany's boss) (episodes 20, 38, 43)
 M.Bhanumati as Sharada, Mrs.Ramany's mother
 Ajay Rathnam as Radhakrishnan, Mrs. Ramany's childhood friend (episodes 10,19)
 Krishnan as tennis player/film director (episodes 17, 45)
 Samuthirakani as Sales representative/Census taker/Director/Bride (episodes 11,31,45,51)
 Sadhasivam as Ramany's father
 Ramachandran as Dharmarajan/Hari Babu
 Benjamin as Uttama Ulaganathan/man at the bus stop (episodes 33,34,37)
 Thadi Balaji as M.N. Dharmarajan (episode 41)
 S Gnanavel
 Mohan Vaidya as Mr. Ramany's uncle "Paatu Chittappa" (episode 21)
 Muthu Subramanium
 Brindha
 Ganesh Babu
 Karpagam
 Krishna
 Nisha
 Thaatsayani
 Rangarajan
 Preeth
 Rushario
 Valli Nayagam
 T. K. S. Chandran as Doctor Reinsein Aayiravatham (episodes 27,32,37,45)
 Telephone Venkatraman
 Gnanavel
 Hari
 Rajesh
 Vijayapriya
 Ezhilarasi
 Mahesh
 'Mimicry' Giri
 Kantha Rao
 Ganesan
 "Mittai" Shanmugam
 Vairavaraj
 Citizen Sivakumar
 Usha
 Mathiazhagan
 Amar
 Dhandapani
 Radhakrishnan

Season 3 

Ram G as Mr. Ramany
Vasuki Anand as Mrs. Ramany

References 

Raj TV television series
Sun TV original programming
1990s Tamil-language television series
2000s Tamil-language television series
Tamil-language television shows
Tamil-language comedy television series